Mahesh Limaye is an Indian cinematographer - director known for his work in Hindi and Marathi cinema.  Some of his work include Traffic Signal, Corporate, Fashion, Heroine, Dabaang, Uttarayan, Natarang, Balgandharva, Rege and Mulshi Pattern.

Early life and education 
Mahesh was born in Dombivli, Maharashtra. Right from his young days he always had an inclination towards arts. He got into Sir J J School of arts and completed his graduation in commercial arts with specialization in photography. His love for music videos made him take keen interest in cinematography.

Career 
Post his graduation from Sir J J School of Arts, Mahesh assisted Raja Sayed, a well known cinematographer. He also got a chance to assist a lot of foreign cinematographers in their advertisement projects.

Mahesh shot his first film as an independent cinematographer with director Marlon Rodrigues in 2005 named CU at 9. Bipin Nadkarni, a advertisement director chose Mahesh to shoot his directorial debut Uttarayan. He shot Bipin's second film Aevdhese Aabhal as well. He had a long partnership with Madhur Bhandarkar with films like Traffiic Signal, Corporate, Fashion and Heroine. He shot 3 films for Ravi Jadhav namely Natarang, Balgandharva and Balak Palak. Mahesh rose to fame when he shot Dabaang with Salman Khan. Mahesh shot some portions of Dabangg 2 and collaborated with Prabhudeva for Dabaangg 3. Mahesh shot Marathi features like Rege, Family Katta, Mulshi Pattern.  He collaborated with Punit Malhotra for Gori Tere Pyaar Mein produced by Dharma Productions.The other films that he has shot include Freaky Ali, Happy Ending, Bhikari, Shentimental.

In 2014, Mahesh debuted as a director with the Marathi feature film Yellow. At the 61st National Film Awards, the film won the Special Jury Award for feature films and two Special Mention awards for the child actors. He also directed two video shorts namely Punaragamanayacha and Aashechi Roshnai.

He has recently worked on the Marathi feature film Sarsenapati Hambirrao Mohite.

Mahesh is currently working on his second directorial named Jaggu ani Juliet. The film is produced by Punit Balan and the duo Ajay-Atul are doing the music for the film.

Filmography

Awards and recognition 
Won the national award for the film Yellow as Best Film Jury.

References 

Living people
Indian cinematographers
Marathi film directors
Film directors from Mumbai
Year of birth missing (living people)